The 10th Jutra Awards were held on March 9, 2008 to honour films made with the participation of the Quebec film industry in 2007.

Winners and nominees

References

2008 in Quebec
Jutra
10
Jutra